Pedetontoides is a genus of jumping bristletails in the family Machilidae. There is one described species in Pedetontoides, P. atlanticus.

References

Further reading

 
 
 
 
 

Archaeognatha
Articles created by Qbugbot